A canvas print is the result of an image printed onto canvas which is often stretched, or gallery-wrapped, onto a frame and displayed. Canvas prints are used as the final output in an art piece, or as a way to reproduce other forms of art.

Printing methods
Reproductions of original artwork have been printed on canvas for many decades using offset printing. Since the 1990s, canvas print has been also been associated with either dye sublimation or inkjet print processes (often referred to as repligraph or giclée respectively). The canvas print material is generally cotton or plastic based poly canvas, often used for the reproduction of photographic images.

Digital files of artwork, paintings, photograph, or drawings may be sent directly to printing companies or Internet based printing services.

Stretcher mounted

One of the display methods is to trimmed the canvas to size then glued, or staple it to traditional stretcher bars, or a wooden panel and displayed it in a frame, or frame-less in a gallery wrap. The stretchers are usually constructed from solid pine and underpinned for added strength. A print that is designed to continue round the edges of a stretcher frame once gallery-wrapped is referred to as full-bleed.

Uses for prints

Canvas prints are used as final output for fine art pieces or for reproduction of other types of two dimensional art (drawings, paintings, photograph, etc.).  

Canvas prints are often used as a cheaper alternative to framed artwork as there is no glazing required and the stretcher is not usually visible, so the prints do not need to be varnished or treated.

See also
 Shaped canvas
 Giclée
 Gallery wrap
 Watercolor paper
 Digital Printing

References

Printmaking
Photographic films